Marudangavayal is a village in the Pattukkottai taluk of Thanjavur district, Tamil Nadu, India.

Demographics 

As per the 2001 census, Marudangavayal had a total population of 454 with 231 males and 223 females. The sex ratio was 965. The literacy rate was 79.1.

References 

 

Villages in Thanjavur district